Silpa Wattanatham, known in English as Art & Culture, is a Thai history magazine and a publishing imprint of Matichon Group. Founded by Sujit Wongthes in 1979, the magazine popularized Thai history and opened up the field, which had previously been restricted to academic circles, to mass consumption.

Writers associated with the magazine, the most prominent of which include Sujit, Srisakara Vallibhotama and Dhida Saraya, mainly argued against the established narrative of Thai history which focused on Tai immigration from southern China and instead stressed the diversity of Thailand's cultural origins.

References

External links
  

1979 establishments in Thailand
History magazines published in Thailand
Magazines established in 1979
Matichon Group
Thai-language mass media